Puerto Rico competed at the 1952 Summer Olympics in Helsinki, Finland. 21 competitors, all men, took part in 19 events in 4 sports.

Athletics

Track events

Field events

Boxing

Legend: 
PTS = Points
KO = Knockout
R = Round

Shooting

Five shooters represented Puerto Rico in 1952.

Men

Weightlifting

References

External links
Official Olympic Reports

Nations at the 1952 Summer Olympics
1952 Summer Olympics
1952 in Puerto Rican sports